The 1987 Women's International Tennis Association (WITA) Championships, also known as the Bausch & Lomb / WITA Championships,  was a women's tennis tournament played on outdoor clay courts at the Amelia Island Plantation on Amelia Island, Florida in the United States that was part of the 1987 WTA Tour. It was the eighth edition of the tournament and was held from April 13 through April 19, 1987. First-seeded Steffi Graf won the singles title and earned $40,000 first-prize money.

Finals

Singles
 Steffi Graf defeated  Hana Mandlíková 6–3, 6–4
 It was Graf's 4th title of the year and the 12th of her career.

Doubles
 Steffi Graf /  Gabriela Sabatini defeated  Hana Mandlíková /  Wendy Turnbull 3–6, 6–3, 7–5
 It was Graf's 1st title of the year and the 6th of her career. It was Sabatini's 1st title of the year and the 7th of her career.

References

External links
 ITF tournament edition details
 Tournament draws

Bausch and Lomb Championships
Amelia Island Championships
WITA Championships
WITA Championships
WITA Championships